Ceylonthelphusa armata is a species of freshwater crabs in the family Gecarcinucidae. The species is endemic to Sri Lanka, and is classed as an endangered due to habitat degradation.

References

Ceylonthelphusa
Taxonomy articles created by Polbot
Crustaceans described in 1995